The 2006 Michigan State Spartans football team represented Michigan State University in the 2006 NCAA Division I FBS football season. Michigan State competed as a member of the Big Ten Conference, and played their home games at Spartan Stadium in East Lansing, Michigan. The Spartans were led by fourth-year head coach John L. Smith. Smith had compiled a combined 18–18 record in his previous seasons at Michigan State, and he was fired after the 2006 season in which the team finished 4–8. The Spartans did, however, set the record for the greatest comeback from a deficit in college football history.

Season recap
Michigan State teams during Smith's tenure were "known for their late season collapses". The Spartans started the 2006 season with a 3–0 record with victories over Idaho, Eastern Michigan, and Pittsburgh. The following week, Michigan State led Notre Dame, 37–21, in the third quarter, but surrendered 19 points to lose the game. The Spartans then lost all but one game on the remainder of their schedule.

On October 21, Michigan State traveled to Evanston, Illinois to face Northwestern. By the third quarter, Northwestern had extended its lead to a commanding 38–3. Michigan State gained momentum in the fourth quarter when Devin Thomas blocked a Northwestern punt, which was then returned for a touchdown by Ashton Henderson. Northwestern was forced to punt twice more and Michigan State capitalized on each possession with a touchdown, which tied the game, 38–38. Placekicker Brett Swenson made good the game-winning field goal with 0:13 remaining to play, and Michigan State won the greatest comeback in college football history.

After the record-setting victory, it appeared that Smith's job was temporarily secured, but the administration fired him shortly after a loss to Indiana the following week. The Spartans ended the season with four consecutive losses to finish with a 4–8 overall record and 1–7 against Big Ten opponents. In November, Mark Dantonio was hired as the replacement head coach.

Schedule

Game summaries

Northwestern

Coaching staff
John L. Smith – Head Coach
Blaine Bennett – Assistant head coach/wide receivers coach
Dave Baldwin – Offensive coordinator/Tight end coach
Dan Enos – Quarterbacks coach
Ben Sirmans – Running backs coach/special teams coordinator
Jeff Stoutland – Offensive line coach
Chris Smeland – Defensive coordinator/safeties
Derrick Jackson – Defensive line coach
Mike Cox – Linebackers coach/recruiting coordinator
Chuck Driesbach – Defensive backs coach

2007 NFL Draft
The following players were selected in the 2007 NFL Draft.

References

Michigan State
Michigan State Spartans football seasons
Michigan State Spartans football